Driven To Perform (DTP) is an auto show billed as Western Canada's largest and most established automotive lifestyles tour and originally featured mainly import tuner sport compact cars. The inaugural show was held in Vancouver, BC in 2002 as Import Showoff Canada, but has since changed its name and expanded to include other vehicle types and into the other large metropolitan cities in this region of Canada. Major sponsors include Toyo Tires, Future Shop, Mobil1, Honda, Mazda, Lordco and Visions Electronics.

History
This particular format of showcasing tuner vehicles originated in the Southern California area of the United States with the event called Import Showoff and was the first of its kind. As the Canadian counterpart, this series followed suit and were produced as Import Showoff Canada in 2002 and 2003 until sponsor Toyo Tires purchased the titling rights and renamed the shows to their current name in 2004.  In fact, "Driven To Perform" ("au-delà de la performance" in French) is a trademarked advertising slogan used by Toyo Tires.  The tour first expanded to include Calgary, Alberta in 2003, Edmonton in 2005, and then Winnipeg, Manitoba in 2008.  Although traditionally associated with import tuner sport compact cars, the events now feature everything from street rods to supercars, DUB-style to racecars, and lowriders to classic cars.  Streetbikes, RC cars and other specialty vehicles have also played a big part in the DTP shows since the beginning.

Description
As a trade and consumer show, exhibitors market and sell various aftermarket products and services for cars ranging from mobile audio-video equipment to engine oils and lubricants.  More recently, non-automotive companies like Pepsi, SoBe and Solo Mobile have participated in the Driven To Perform events to target the young, affluent and traditionally male demographics. Frequently, spokesmodels are present to attract showgoers and to pose for photographs alongside cars.  These models are also known as import models or booth babes and have gained massive popularity among those in the import scene and now beyond into mainstream media and pop culture. Increasingly, music (mostly hip-hop, urban and electronica) and dance have become a large part of the Driven To Perform tour.  Whether its DJs spinning the latest tracks, up and coming recording artists performing onstage or B-boys and Go-Go dancing, the lights, the sound and the movement are now an unavoidable staple of these multi-faceted events. The Canadian Street Dance Competition held annually within the Vancouver stop of the tour has in recent years grown to become its own standalone show; especially amongst the street dance community.  Though conceptually different in theme, execution and scope, DTP shares many similarities and has been compared to the Hot Import Nights series operating in the USA, although much smaller and with fewer attendees.

Events
Driven To Perform hosts one-day events in four of the largest metropolitan areas in Western Canada; usually in the summer, between the months of May and July.  These four areas include Vancouver CMA (Surrey), Calgary CMA, Edmonton CMA, Winnipeg CMA, and not coincidentally, three of these are also the fastest growing and only Canadian cities west of Ontario with populations exceeding 1,000,000 persons. They rank 3rd, 5th, 6th and 8th, respectively, in the list of the largest cities in Canada only behind Toronto CMA (Mississauga) (1st), Montreal CMA (Laval) (2nd), Ottawa–Gatineau CMA (4th), and Quebec City CMA (Lévis) (7th).

The shows are open to the public with general admission ticket prices between CAD$15 and $20.  Individuals who wish to enter their vehicles into competition at the events must pay a higher registration fee but are typically compensated with complimentary VIP access for themselves.  In addition to cars, all DTP shows also feature separate competitions for performance motorbikes, R/C cars, and even a street dance competition for hip-hop dancers.

DTP in Vancouver attracted approximately 12,000 to 12,500 attendees in each year between 2005 and 2006.

Tour dates and locations

2008 Tour 
 May 24, 2008 — Calgary, AB at the Olympic Oval
 May 31, 2008 — Vancouver, BC at the BC Place Stadium
 June 14, 2008 — Edmonton, AB at the Northlands Agricom
 July 5, 2008 — Winnipeg, MB at the Winnipeg Convention Centre
 Additional dates and locations may be announced

2007 Tour 
 June 2, 2007 — Calgary, AB at the Olympic Oval
 June 16, 2007 — Edmonton, AB at the Northlands Agricom
 June 23, 2007 — Vancouver, BC at the BC Place Stadium

Past/present participants

 Toyo Tires
 Future Shop
 Mobil1
 GTA Synthetics
 Honda
 Mazda/Mazdaspeed
 Lordco
 Visions Electronics
 Nitto Tire
 Pepsi/Diet Pepsi/Diet Pepsi Max
 SoBe

 Solo Mobile
 A'PEXi U.S.A.
 Mackin Industries
 Exedy Globalparts
 TEIN U.S.A
 Mitsubishi Motors
 Formula D
 Volk Racing Wheel
 Lipton Brisk
 Ford Canadian Tire Toyota TRD
 Dew Fuel
 Dodge
 Sony
 Subaru
 London Drugs
 BMW MINI
 Amsoil
 Eckō Unltd.

 Rogers Wireless
 Mission Raceway Park
 Rockstar
 The Beat 94.5
 FM 99.3 The FOX
 Vibe 98.5
 CJAY 92
 91.7 The Bounce
 Sonic 102.9
 The Bear

 The Georgia Straight
 Youthink Magazine
 Shark Energy
 Note: Not a complete list

Notable appearances

 Kaba Modern, "America's Best Dance Crew" Cast Members, 2008
 Jason "The Athlete" MacDonald, U.F.C. Middleweight, Canadian mixed martial artist, 2008
 Arianny Celeste, Official U.F.C. Octagon Girl, 2008
 Jennylee Berns, "Beauty and the Geek" Cast Member and U.F.C. Ring Girl, 2007
 Melissa Reyes, "Pussycat Dolls Present: The Search For the Next Doll" Cast Member, 2008
 Jayla Rubinelli, "America's Next Top Model" Cast Member, 2007-2008
 Cory Lee, Chinese/German-Canadian pop singer/songwriter, 2005
 Elise Estrada, Filipina-Canadian pop singer/former beauty queen, 2008
 Crystal Lowe, Canadian actress, 2002-2005
 Sunny Leone, Indo-Canadian model and pornographic actress, 2003
 Tiffany Toth, Playboy Cyber Girl, 2008
 Francine Dee, Filipina/Chinese-American model, 2003
 Kaila Yu, Taiwanese-American model and pop singer, 2002
 Mercedes Terrell, Sicilian/Mexican-American model, 2006
 Courtney Day, American model, 2006

 Jeri Lee, Filipina/Mexican-American model, 2005
 KT So, Chinese-American model, 2005-2006
 Christine Mendoza, Filipina-American model, 2002, 2006
 Stephanie Ly, Chinese-Canadian model, 2005-2006
 Misa Campo, Filipina/Dutch-Canadian model, 2007-2008
 Florence Hung, Chinese/French-Canadian model, 2003-2004
Note: Not a complete list

See also
 Hot Import Nights

References

External links
 Driven To Perform Official Website
 Tuner car heaven at Driven to Perform, The Vancouver Sun
 Driven to Perform expands scope with latest show, Edmonton Journal
 Review and coverage of DTP Vancouver 2006, Car and Model
 Shark Energy gallery, Shark Energy

Automotive advertising slogans
Automotive industry in Canada
Auto shows in Canada
Vehicle modification media
Recurring events established in 2002
2002 establishments in Canada